Cypress Creek may refer to:
United States
 Cypress Creek station, a rail station in Fort Lauderdale, Florida
 Cypress Creek (Logan Creek), a stream in Missouri
 Cypress Creek (Texas), a stream in  Waller County, Texas, United States
 Cypress Creek EMS, an emergency medical service provider in Houston, Texas
 Cypress Creek High School (disambiguation)
 Cypress Creek National Wildlife Refuge, Illinois, United States
 Cypress Creek Preserve, a 7,400 acre park in Pasco County, Florida
 Cypress Creek Preserve, Pasco County, a 255-acre area of protected land in Pasco County, Florida
 Cypress Creek Town Center, Wesley Chapel, Florida
 Little Cypress Creek Bridge, Phillips County, Arkansas

Fictional
 Cypress Creek, a fictional place as seen on The Simpsons episode "You Only Move Twice"